The Diocese of Chelmsford is a Church of England diocese, part of the Province of Canterbury. It was created on 23 January 1914 from part of the Diocese of St Albans. It covers Essex and part of East London. It is divided into three episcopal areas, each with its own area bishop. It has 463 parishes and 588 churches.

History
The diocese was created on 23 January 1914, as part of the provisions of the Bishoprics of Sheffield, Chelmsford and the County of Suffolk Act 1913. It covered the entire county of Essex and that part of Kent north of the River Thames (North Woolwich). The area had since 4 May 1877 been part of the Diocese of St Albans. Before 1 January 1846 the area was part of the Diocese of London and then the Diocese of Rochester.

Geographic area
It covers Essex and five East London boroughs of Barking and Dagenham, Havering, Newham, Redbridge, and Waltham Forest. The diocese has seen one of the strongest regenerations in Europe, which continues. The Thames Gateway, the M11 corridor, Stansted and Southend airports, Harwich, Tilbury, London Gateway, Purfleet ports and most of the housing built in connection with the London 2012 Olympics are in the diocese. It is co-terminous with the boundaries of the Catholic Diocese of Brentwood.

Organisation
The diocese of Chelmsford is overseen by the Bishop of Chelmsford. Since the area scheme was created in 1983 and inaugurated in January 1984, the diocese has been divided into three episcopal areas which are overseen by an area bishop. The diocese is divided further into archdeaconries, each divided into a number of deaneries.

The suffragan See of Colchester was created in 1882, for the Diocese of St Albans until 1914. Barking in 1901 also for St Albans, and Bradwell in 1968.

Bishops

Alongside the diocesan Bishop of Chelmsford (Guli Francis-Dehqani), the Diocese has three area (suffragan) bishops: Roger Morris, area Bishop of Colchester; Lynne Cullens, area Bishop of Barking ; and area Bishop of Bradwell (vacant).

Alternative episcopal oversight (for parishes in the diocese which reject the ministry of priests who are women) is provided by the provincial episcopal visitor, Norman Banks, Bishop suffragan of Richborough, who is licensed as an honorary assistant bishop of the diocese in order to facilitate his work there.

Churches 
The diocese has 463 parishes and a total of 588 churches.

References

Sources
Church of England Statistics 2002

External links

Churches in the Diocese of Chelmsford (A Church Near You) 
Chelmsford Cathedral

 
1914 establishments in England
City of Chelmsford
Dioceses established in the 20th century
Chelmsford
Religion in Essex
Religion in the London Borough of Barking and Dagenham
Religion in the London Borough of Havering
Religion in the London Borough of Newham
Religion in the London Borough of Waltham Forest